Son of Man is a science fiction novel by American writer Robert Silverberg, published in 1971. The book is about Clay, a 20th-century man, who travels billions of years into the future and meets humanity in its future forms. Some of the issues discussed in the book are sexuality, telepathic communication between people, physical prowess or frailty, division of humans by caste or ability, and the preservation of ancient wisdom, among other things.

Reception
Norman Spinrad has described it as "brilliant". Matt Hughes considers it "an artifact of its period, a remarkable, heady, head-trippy plunge into a new way of writing sf, and into a new way of thinking", but notes that because Silverberg is addressing "the timeless questions -- what are we? where do we come from? where are we going?", the book has not become "stale and musty".

References

External links
Description of the book on the Quasi-Official Site for Robert Silverberg's works
  
 Son of Man at Worlds Without End

1971 American novels
Books about evolution
Evolution in popular culture
Speculative evolution
Novels by Robert Silverberg
Novels about time travel
Novels about intersex